Marmaduke Blakiston was a 17th-century English priest.

Blakiston was born in York and educated at The Queen's College, Oxford. He held livings at Redmarshall and Sedgefield. He was Archdeacon of the East Riding from 1615 until his resignation in 1625. He was also a prebendary of York and Durham.

References

17th-century English Anglican priests
Alumni of The Queen's College, Oxford
Archdeacons of the East Riding
People from York